Gobitrichinotus is a genus of sand darters, with one species from rivers in Madagascar and another from coastal waters (salt, brackish and fresh) of the western Pacific Ocean.

Species
There are currently two recognized species in this genus:
 Gobitrichinotus arnoulti Kiener, 1963
 Gobitrichinotus radiocularis Fowler, 1943

References

 
Kraemeriidae
Gobiidae
Taxonomy articles created by Polbot